Urlu-Aspak is a rural locality (a selo) in Biryulinskoye Rural Settlement of Mayminsky District, the Altai Republic, Russia. The population was 427 as of 2016. There are 5 streets.

Geography 
Urlu-Aspak is located in the valley of the Mayma River, 49 km southeast of Mayma (the district's administrative centre) by road. Alexandrovka is the nearest rural locality.

References 

Rural localities in Mayminsky District